Marian Pâcleșan (born 14 October 1974) is a Romanian former footballer who played as a midfielder. In 2012, after ending his football career, Pâcleșan started to work as a lawyer.

Honours
Jiul Petroșani
Divizia B: 2003–04

References

External links
Marian Pâcleșan at Labtof.ro

1974 births
Living people
Romanian footballers
Association football midfielders
Liga I players
Liga II players
CSM Unirea Alba Iulia players
FC Sportul Studențesc București players
AFC Rocar București players
FC U Craiova 1948 players
CSM Ceahlăul Piatra Neamț players
FC UTA Arad players
CSM Jiul Petroșani players
21st-century Romanian judges
Footballers from Bucharest